Sau Reservoir is a reservoir located on the Ter river, near Vilanova de Sau, Catalonia, Spain. The dam was completed in 1962, creating a reservoir with a storage capacity of 151.3 hm³ that covered the former town of Sant Romà de Sau. The Church of Sant Romà is  still visible when the water level is low. The dam has a structural height of 83 m and a crest length of 260 m.

See also
List of dams and reservoirs in Catalonia

References

External links

Vilanova de Sau Official Website 
Weekly storage summary of Pantà de Sau 

Reservoirs in Catalonia
Osona